Quercus oleoides, with Spanish common names encina or encino, is a Mesoamerican species of oak in the southern live oaks section of the genus Quercus (section Virentes). It grows in dry forests and pastureland of eastern and southern Mexico and much of Central America, from Guanacaste Province in Costa Rica north as far as the State of Tamaulipas in northeastern Mexico.

Quercus oleoides is a slow-growing tree, reaching  in height.

Its wood is extremely heavy with intercrossed grains; the sapwood is white, and heartwood brown.

References

External links
 Arctos  Collaborative Collection Management Solution, Taxonomy Details for Quercus oleoides var. sagraeana
 Plants of Viñales pictorial guide - Quercus oleoides subsp. sagraeana

oleoides
Trees of Central America
Oaks of Mexico
Plants described in 1830
Flora of the Central American pine–oak forests
Flora of the Sierra Madre Oriental
Petén–Veracruz moist forests
Veracruz moist forests